Akameros—his original name was probably Akamir—was the "archon of the Sclavenes of Belzetia", an autonomous South Slavic community in Central Greece under Byzantine sovereignty, in the late 8th century.

He is mentioned only once, by Theophanes the Confessor, as leading a plot involving the sons of Constantine V – the former Caesares Nikephoros and Christopher, and their younger brothers Niketas, Anthimos and Eudokimos – who had been deposed, mutilated by their elder brother, the emperor Leo IV the Khazar. After Leo's death, his wife, Irene of Athens, deposed her son Constantine VI in 797, and sent his uncles in exile to Athens so that they would not threaten her rule. In March 799, Akameros, in collusion with troops from the local theme of Hellas, planned to seize them and declare one of them emperor. The plot was foiled however as Irene was informed of it, and the Empress sent a trusted kinsman to Athens: the brothers were blinded and moved to the island of Panormos in the Marmara Sea. Nothing further is heard of Akameros.

The area of Belzetia has been identified by some scholars with the area of settlement of the Belegezitai around Demetrias in eastern Thessaly, but this is probably an error, and the origin of Belzetia has to be sought with another Slavic tribe, the Berzetai.

References

Sources
 
 
 
 

8th-century Byzantine people
8th-century Slavs
Byzantine governors
South Slavic history
Medieval Central Greece
People of medieval Greece
Byzantine people of Slavic descent
8th century in Greece
Slavic warriors